Magdalena Paraschiv (born 11 August 1982) is a Romanian handball player. She plays for the Romanian club Gloria Bistrița.

International honours
EHF Challenge Cup:
Finalist: 2004, 2007

References 

Living people
Romanian female handball players 
1982 births
People from Buzău